Swaziland competed at the 1984 Summer Olympics in Los Angeles, United States.  The nation returned to the Olympic Games after boycotting both the 1976 and the 1980 Games.

Athletics

Men
Track and road events

Boxing

Men

Swimming

Men

Weightlifting

Men

References
Official Olympic Reports

Nations at the 1984 Summer Olympics
1984
Oly